In cricket, pinch hitter or slogger is the usual term for a batsman (not a substitute, unlike in baseball) promoted up the batting order in order to score quick runs.  As attempting to score runs quickly involves playing more aggressive shots and thus an increased likelihood of being dismissed, it is generally considered unwise for a top-order batsman to attempt this.  Therefore, a lower-order batsman (such as a bowler) is sometimes promoted. There is less importance placed on his wicket, so he can play with more freedom.  This is an important tactic in One Day International cricket, with its occurrence in Test cricket far less regular. 

The term was relatively recently introduced to cricket and was unfamiliar to many cricket followers before the 1992 World Cup. New Zealand employed a slightly different form of the tactic to considerable effect with Mark Greatbatch playing the pinch-hitting role. This was among other innovative tactics New Zealand employed successfully during the round-robin stage to reach the knockout stage.

It has since been used throughout limited overs cricket, with the aggressive batsmen known as "pinch-hitters."

However, "pinch hitter" usually refers to an aggressive batsman moved up the batting order from his usual place, used in situations where scoring runs quickly becomes more important than keeping wickets in hand.

Pinch hitters are known for their big hitting and high strike rates. However, they sometimes lack the technique of higher-class batsmen and therefore often go out for low scores through their excessive attacking.  This is not the same as a "nightwatchman" used in Test and first-class matches.

Examples of pinch hitters 

 - Mohammad Rafique
 - Mehidy Hasan Miraz
 - Shahid Afridi
 - Hasan Ali
 - Mitchell Starc
 - Ash Gardner
 - David Miller 
 - Chris Morris
 - Sunil Narine
 - Ravichandran Ashwin 
 - Ravindra Jadeja
 - Hardik Pandya 
 - Rishabh Pant 
 - Mitchell McClenaghan
 - David Willey
 - Sam Curran

References 

 The Times of India, "Why is a pinch hitter in cricket called so?", Published 16 Feb 2003, Retrieved 18 June 2014
 Martin Williamson, Cricinfo, "Why is a pinch hitter in cricket called so?", Retrieved 18 June 2014

Cricket terminology
Batting (cricket)
Cricket captaincy and tactics